Ardley is a village and civil parish in Oxfordshire, England, about  northwest of Bicester. The parish includes the village of Fewcott, which is now contiguous with Ardley. 

The 2011 Census recorded the population of Ardley parish as 751.

Geography and natural history

The two villages of Ardley and Fewcott are on either side of a stream that rises at Fritwell, flows south to Ardley, then turns east through Stoke Lyne to Fringford. There it joins Crowell Brook, which continues east into Buckinghamshire and ultimately becomes part of the Great Ouse.

The limestone quarry at Ardley has yielded a significant find of dinosaur tracks (ichnites), discovered in 1997 and thought to have been left by Megalosaurus and possibly Cetiosaurus. Some of these are on display in the dinosaur garden at the Oxfordshire Museum in Woodstock, Oxfordshire.

There is a site of special scientific interest in the village with a colony of the great crested newts and an outcrop of Jurassic limestone.

Castle
Ardley Castle is a motte-and-bailey which is believed to have been built early in the 12th century during the civil war between Empress Matilda and King Stephen.

Parish church
The Church of England parish church of Saint Mary dates from at least 1074. The original church was demolished and completely rebuilt, but both the chancel and the bell tower of the present building contain small amounts of re-used Norman stonework. The present Early English Gothic chancel was built late in the 12th or early in the 13th century. The tower has a saddleback roof and may have been built in the 13th or 14th century. The present nave was built in 1793 and has a west gallery that was added in 1834.

St Mary's is now part of the Benefice of Cherwell Valley, along with the parishes of Fritwell, Lower Heyford, Somerton, Souldern and Upper Heyford.

The canal engineer Samuel Simcock (1727–1804) and his wife Esther (1720–1808), a sister of James Brindley, are buried at St Mary's.

Economic history
The line passes within a few hundred yards of Ardley and the GWR opened a railway station on the main road just south of the village. British Railways closed Ardley railway station in 1963. The railway remains open and is now part of the Chiltern Main Line.

In 1990 the section of the M40 motorway between Wheatley and Hockley Heath was built.

Amenities

Ardley has a public house, the Fox and Hounds. Fewcott also has a pub, the White Lion Inn.

The village has no shops. Those at Cherwell Valley services are the nearest to the village.

Ardley United Football Club is a Non-League football club whose first team plays its home games at The Playing Fields. Its first team is in the FTL Futbol Hellenic League Premier Division.

References

External links

Villages in Oxfordshire
Civil parishes in Oxfordshire
Cherwell District